Harcsa is a Hungarian surname. Notable people with the surname include:

Veronika Harcsa (born 1982), Hungarian singer and songwriter
Zoltán Harcsa (born 1992), Hungarian boxer

Hungarian-language surnames